The M'bwebwe painters and poets originally met while attending Kent State University in the U.S. state of Ohio in the mid-1970s. They include painters David Wayne Cole, Thomas David Little (1955–2006), and James F. Quinlan, sculptor Christopher Cosma, computer artist Jeff Brice, and multi-media artists Peter Brill and Mark Bloch. The group soon grew to include others including Douglas Ferguson, Sylvia Sherry, Susan Cole, Lauren Silver, Nan Truitt and John Fletcher.

The word M'bwebwe does not in itself mean anything. It was uttered at random one day, although who uttered it is now forgotten, when it was time to select a name for a particular event and it stuck. It has since come to represent either a place or a group of artists, depending on usage.

In 1978, M'bwebwe began as an art space at 23 Second Avenue on Manhattan's Lower East Side. The living quarters and studios, located above a Jewish monument store in a former B'nai B'rith meeting hall, soon became a de facto exhibition space, dance club and neighborhood hangout that garnered attention by hipsters and cognoscenti around the rapidly changing area soon to be known as the East Village.

While the M'bwebwe painting style held craftsmanship in high esteem, the subject matter could be described as irreverent, Dada, tongue in cheek and funky. A number of musical projects, most notably by  Quinlan, Brill, Little and Bloch, took the funk idea back to its roots as a musical style (see George Clinton, James Brown and Robert Wyatt) that was blended with elements of Devo and Pere Ubu that had also come out of northern Ohio. M'bwebwe is also linked to predecessors such as Dada, Surrealism, Fluxus, concept art, punk, industrial music, and electropop, and most importantly, 'pataphysics.

The M'bwebwe group is less a style of art or music than a loosely-knit group of artists from the midwest with a likeminded penchant for the Gabba Gabba Hey sensibility that could be heard emanating from the club CBGB located just behind the M'bwebwe space on Second Avenue. M'bwebwe the geographical location existed from 1979 to 1982. Most of the original participants still reside in New York City. One of the founders of the group, Tom Little, a painter musician and master printmaker, died  in 2006 due to natural causes.

Mbwebwe is an African surname.  Mbwebwe Province is the home of George of the Jungle.

External links
Official site of Mark Bloch
Tribute to Tom Little (1955-2006). 
Interview with Mark Bloch.

American artist groups and collectives
Culture of New York City